Werner's Nomenclature of Colours is a book of named colour samples compiled by Abraham Gottlob Werner, and subsequently amended by Patrick Syme. The book, first published in 1814, was used by Charles Darwin in his scientific observations. Werner's Nomenclature can be viewed as a predecessor of modern named colour systems such as Pantone.  The colours are illustrated and described, and examples shown of their use in ornithological plates in The Anatomy of Colour by Patrick Baty.

References

External links 
 Online edition

Color
1814 non-fiction books
Books about color